Andrea Petkovic was the defending champion, but she lost to Angelique Kerber in the semifinals.

Kerber went on to win her first outdoor title, defeating Madison Keys in the final, 6–2, 4–6, 7–5.

Seeds
The top eight seeds receive a bye into the second round.

Draw

Finals

Top half

Section 1

Section 2

Bottom half

Section 3

Section 4

Qualifying

Seeds

Qualifiers

Draw

First qualifier

Second qualifier

Third qualifier

Fourth qualifier

Fifth qualifier

Sixth qualifier

Seventh qualifier

Eighth qualifier

References

 Main Draw
 Qualifying Draw

2015 WTA Tour
2015